Mont Clare Station was a station on the Pennsylvania Railroad's Schuylkill Branch line, in Mont Clare, Pennsylvania.  The line opened in 1884 and the station closed between 1955 and 1958.

The station was originally built by the Pennsylvania Schuylkill Valley Railroad.  In 1900, the Pennsylvania Railroad combined the line with five other subsidiaries to form the Schuylkill and Juniata Railroad.  Two years later, the subsidiaries were eliminated and PRR took direct ownership of the line.  PRR discontinued the Mont Clare station between 1955 and 1958. All service on the line was formally discontinued by Norfolk Southern Railway in 2007.

References

Former Pennsylvania Railroad stations
Railway stations in Montgomery County, Pennsylvania